is a Japanese manga artist, born in Mannō, Kagawa. He is the writer and illustrator of the baseball manga, Ace of Diamond which won the 2008 Shogakukan Manga Award in the shōnen category.

References

1974 births
Living people
Manga artists from Kagawa Prefecture